William Rice Kent (27 February 1873 – 8 March 1956) was an Irish politician from County Cork.

Kent and three brothers—Thomas, David and Richard—were involved in a gunfight with the Royal Irish Constabulary (RIC) at their home, Bawnard, in Castlelyons, County Cork in May 1916, following the Easter Rising, in which Richard was killed, as well as a head constable. Thomas was court-martialled for the killing and executed, and David was sentenced to death, which was commuted to life imprisonment, but William was acquitted.

He was first elected as a Fianna Fáil Teachta Dála (TD) for the Cork East constituency at the September 1927 general election. He lost his seat at the 1932 general election. He was elected as a National Centre Party TD at the 1933 general election. Unlike the other members of his party, he did not join Fine Gael when the National Centre Party merged with Cumann na nGaedheal in September 1933. He did not contest the 1937 general election.

His brother David Kent was a Sinn Féin TD for Cork East from 1918 to 1927.

See also
Families in the Oireachtas

References

1873 births
1956 deaths
Fianna Fáil TDs
National Centre Party (Ireland) TDs
Independent TDs
Fine Gael TDs
Members of the 6th Dáil
Members of the 8th Dáil
Politicians from County Cork